The Scioto Company was led by American colonel William Duer, a speculator who worked with a British colleague and several French men to register and organize the company in Paris, France. Ostensibly working with the Ohio Company to purchase land in the Northwest Territory, agents of this institution sold worthless deeds to French people intending to emigrate to the United States. Many were refugees from the excesses of the French Revolution, and the émigrés were made up of minor aristocrats, merchants, artisans and craftsmen. The Scioto Company did not own the land it was selling.

History
The Scioto Land Company was founded by American speculator Colonel William Duer and others in 1787 after the Northwest Territory was organized. It was officially established in 1789 as the Compagnie du Scioto in Paris by American Joel Barlow; William Playfair, a Scot who was the agent of Duer and his associates abroad; plus six Frenchmen.

The dishonesty of those who conducted the sales in France, the shady methods of Barlow, and the failure of Duer and his associates to meet their contract with the Ohio Company, caused the collapse of the Scioto Company early in 1790. Two subsequent attempts to revive it failed.

Meanwhile, about  had been purportedly "sold" to prospective settlers, companies and individuals in France. On February 19, 1791, 218 of these purchasers left Havre de Grace, in France, and arrived on May 3 in Alexandria, District of Columbia (now Alexandria, Virginia).

They were among a group known as the French 500, many of whom were fleeing the disruption of the French Revolution. On their arrival, they were told that the Scioto Company owned no land. When they reached Marietta, Ohio, along the Ohio River, about fifty of them landed. In October 1791, the rest of the company proceeded to Gallipolis, which was laid out about that time. It is now within Gallia County, Ohio. The developer had built rude huts for the group, who were mostly urban residents with few skills to survive on the undeveloped frontier. The agent assured them that this site was within the boundary of their purchase. This land, however, fell within the limits of the tract bought outright by the Ohio Company. It had sold it to the Scioto Company, but reclaimed it after Scioto Company failed to complete its payments.

In 1795, the Ohio Company sold to the French settlers for $1.25 an acre ($309/km2) the land they occupied and adjacent improved lots. They effectively had to pay twice for their land.

This is known as the First French Grant. Some of the company moved to that area, but most remained in Gallipolis, committed to the land they had started to develop. Four thousand acres of the French Grant were reserved for John Gabriel Gervais, and 20,000 acres were to be divided among the remaining inhabitants of Gallipolis.

Eight inhabitants of Gallipolis somehow missed out on the 1795 distribution. With their lives having been started in Gallipolis, most of the French residents never occupied either of the grants; they either sold their allotted land or sent tenant farmers to occupy their plots.

Notes

References

 

Northwest Territory
Companies established in 1787
Early American land companies
Pre-statehood history of Ohio
Gallia County, Ohio
Scioto County, Ohio
1787 establishments in France
French companies established in 1787